The Italian Basketball Hall of Fame (IBHOF) is a hall of fame that honours individuals (or whole teams) that have contributed to the spread and improvement of Italian basketball, through their sporting contributions, their behaviour and their actions in support of the game in Italy.

The Italian Basketball Federation has inducted a class every year since 2007 (counting for the previous year) with an official ceremony that crowns athletes (male and female), coaches, referees or other figureheads who have contributed to Italian basketball, with a maximum of seven inductees per year (teams exempted). 
Those also in the Naismith Hall of Fame or the FIBA Hall of Fame are not limited in number, in addition, two individuals who are deceased at most can also be inducted in memoriam yearly.

History
The Hall of Fame was established by the Italian Basketball Federation (FIP) on 16 September 2006, with the first class (that of 2006) inducted on 11 February 2007 in Bologna. Sandro Riminucci, who broke a LBA record with 77 points in 1963, Sandro Gamba, who had a hand in defeating the Soviet Union national basketball team at the 1980 Olympics, Dado Lombardi and Paolo Vittori were honoured, as well as Cesare Rubini (a Naismith Hall of Fame member like Gamba) and Dino Meneghin (in both the Naismith and FIBA Hall of Fame).

The 2008 class, inducted in Bologna on 22 February 2009, saw former Virtus Bologna head coach Ettore Messina amongst the inductees.

The 2014 class, inducted in Rome on 23 March 2015, had a number of former Pallacanestro Varese members; Antonio Bulgheroni was crowned for his career both as Varese player (winning three LBA titles) and president (adding the 1999 title to become the only person to have won both as player and president), whilst Marino Zanatta and Fabrizio Della Fiori were honoured for their playing contributions to their clubs and the senior Italian national basketball team.

Inductees

Athletes

The honour is bestowed on athletes that have distinguished themselves on the domestic or international front, with either a minimum of 50 or 30 national team caps to respectively the men's national team and the women's national team, an Italian domestic first division (LBA) title, a European-wide cup title, or a medal at the senior EuroBasket, FIBA World Cup, or Summer Olympic Games. They have to have stopped playing for at least five years prior to the nomination.

Head coaches
The honour is bestowed to head coaches who have distinguished themselves at home or abroad, winning either a medal at the senior EuroBasket, FIBA World Cup, or Olympic Summer Games, a European-wide club competition, or the Italian first division title (LBA) with either men's or women's teams and clubs.
They have to be at least 65 years old at their nomination, and possess a national coaching license. Only one can be designated per year.

Teams

The honour can be bestowed to an Italian basketball club that has distinguished itself on the national or international scene, by winning Italian first division (LBA) titles or European-wide cups, and who has through its actions and results, left a vivid memory to basketball followers.

If the club is defunct, the prize can be received by a representative former member. It can also be awarded to an Italian national team (men's or women's), that has won a medal in a EuroBasket, FIBA World Cup, or Summer Olympic Games.

Referees
The honour can be bestowed to referees who have distinguished themselves, at home or abroad, that have officiated for at least 10 years. They must have participated in at least a senior level EuroBasket, FIBA World Cup, Summer Olympic Games, or a European-wide cup final for clubs, for either men or women. The awardee must have stopped officiating for at least five years, prior to the award. Only one can be designated per year.

Contributors ("a life for basketball")
The "a life for basketball" honour, is awarded to those who have contributed significantly to the development of Italian basketball, be it domestically or internationally. They receive recognition for their actions in either Italian or international sports organisations. Any contributor who has been involved in Italian basketball, for at least twenty years, can be designated. There is a single designation per year, unless otherwise warranted by special circumstances.

In memoriam
The Italian Basketball Hall of Fame, can also honour deceased individuals, who have contributed significantly to the development of Italian basketball, be it domestically or internationally. A single awardee can be chosen each year, and nominations aren't accepted. The Italian Basketball Federation chooses the individual honoured in memoriam itself.

See also
College Basketball Hall of Fame
Basketball Hall of Fame
 List of members of the Naismith Memorial Basketball Hall of Fame
 List of players in the Naismith Memorial Basketball Hall of Fame
 List of coaches in the Naismith Memorial Basketball Hall of Fame
FIBA Hall of Fame
 List of members of the FIBA Hall of Fame
EuroLeague Hall of Fame
Greek Basket League Hall of Fame
French Basketball Hall of Fame
VTB United League Hall of Fame
Finnish Basketball Hall of Fame
Australian Basketball Hall of Fame
Philippine Basketball Association Hall of Fame
Women's Basketball Hall of Fame

References

External links
Official website  Retrieved 13 September 2015

Awards established in 2006
Basketball in Italy
Basketball museums and halls of fame
Halls of fame in Italy
2006 establishments in Italy
European basketball awards